Dominik Graf (born 6 September 1952) is a German film director. He studied film direction at University of Television and Film Munich, from where he graduated in 1975. While he has directed several theatrically released feature films since the 1980s, he more often finds work in television, focussing primarily on the genres police drama, thriller and crime mystery, although he has also made comedies, melodramas, documentaries and essay films. He is an active participant in public discourse about the values of genre film in Germany, through numerous articles, and interviews, some of which have been collected into a book.

Graf achieved international recognition in 2014 with his  film Beloved Sisters, which was selected as the German entry for the Best Foreign Language Film at the 87th Academy Awards, but was not nominated.

Selected filmography

Director

 1975: Carlas Briefe
 1979: Der kostbare Gast
 1980: Der Familientag
 1982:  (anthology film)
 1982: 
 1983: Köberle kommt (TV series, 6 episodes)
 1984: 
 1985: 
 1985–1993: Der Fahnder (TV series, 12 episodes) 
 1986: Tatort –  (TV series episode)
 1988: The Cat
 1988: Bei Thea
 1989: Tiger, Lion, Panther
 1990: 
 1993:  – Die Verflechtung (TV series episode)
 1994: 
 1995: Tatort –  (TV series episode)
 1996:  und das Loch in der Wand (TV series episode)
 1996: Reise nach Weimar
 1997: 
 1997: Doktor Knock
 1998:  und der brennende Arm (TV series episode)
 1999: Your Best Years
 1999: Bitter Innocence
 2002: A Map of the Heart
 2002: 
 2002: 
 2004: 
 2004: Polizeiruf 110 –  (TV series episode)
 2005: 
 2006: A City Is Blackmailed
 2006: Polizeiruf 110 –  (TV series episode)
 2007: 
 2008: Kommissar Süden und der Luftgitarrist (TV series episode)
 2009: Germany 09 – Der Weg, den wir nicht zusammen gehen
 2010: Im Angesicht des Verbrechens (TV miniseries)
 2011: 
 2011: Polizeiruf 110 –  (TV series episode)
 2011: 
 2013: Tatort –  (TV series episode)
 2014: Beloved Sisters
 2014: Die reichen Leichen. Ein Starnbergkrimi
 2014: Polizeiruf 110 –  (TV series episode)
 2016: 
 2016: 
 2017: Tatort –  (TV series episode)
 2018: 
 2019: Polizeiruf 110 – Die Lüge, die wir Zukunft nennen (TV series episode)
 2020: Tatort – In der Familie (TV series episode)
 2021: Fabian: Going to the Dogs

Documentaries
 1997:  – Das Wispern im Berg der Dinge
 2000: 
 2012: Lawinen der Erinnerung (about )
 2014: Es werde Stadt! 50 Jahre Grimme-Preis in Marl
 2015: Was heißt hier Ende? (about )
 2016: Verfluchte Liebe deutscher Film (co-director: Johannes F. Sievert)
 2017: Offene Wunde deutscher Film (co-director: Johannes F. Sievert)
 2017: Philip Rosenthal – Der Unternehmer, der nicht an den Kapitalismus glaubte (about Philip Rosenthal)

Actor
  (1977), as Pavel Sixta
 1+1=3 [de] (1979), as Bernhard Grabowski
 Danni (1983), as Lothar
 Father's Day (1996), as Lorenz

Prizes 
 1980 – Bayerischer Filmpreis in the category Young talents for Der kostbare Gast, his dissertation film at filmschool
 1983 – Brussels International Fantastic Film Festival: Special prize Second Sight
 1988 – Filmband in Gold (best director) für The Cat
 1989 – Fernsehfilmpreis der Deutschen Akademie der Darstellenden Künste for Tiger, Lion, Panther
 1993 – Goldener Gong for Morlock – Die Verflechtung
 1995 – Goldener Gong for Tatort: Frau Bu lacht
 1997 – Grimme-Preis for Sperling und das Loch in der Wand (zusammen mit Benedict Neuenfels)
 1998 – Bayerischer Fernsehpreis, Special prize for the TV films The Scorpion, Dr. Knock and Das Wispern im Berg der Dinge
 1998 – Grimme-Preis for Doktor Knock
 1998 – Telestar for The Scorpion
 1998 – Fernsehfilmpreis der Deutschen Akademie der Darstellenden Künste for The Scorpion
 1999 – Fernsehfilmpreis der Deutschen Akademie der Darstellenden Künste for Sperling und der brennende Arm
 1999 – Grimme-Preis for Denk ich an Deutschland… – Das Wispern im Berg der Dinge
 2003 – Grimme-Preis for Friends of Friends
 2003 – Filmpreis der Stadt Hof
 2004 – Deutscher Fernsehpreis for Cold Spring 
 2004 – Hans Abich Preis for extraordinary achievement in television drama
 2005 – DIVA-Award – Beste Regieleistung des Jahres (Jurypreis)
 2006 – Grimme-Preis Gold for Polizeiruf 110 – Der scharlachrote Engel
 2007 – At Madrid Móstoles International Film Festival – Best director for The Red Cockatoo
 2007 – Grimme-Preis for Polizeiruf 110: Er sollte tot
 2007 – Fernsehfilmpreis der Deutschen Akademie der Darstellenden Künste: Special prize for feature film direction for A City Is Blackmailed
 2008 – Grimme-Preis for A City Is Blackmailed
 2008 – Filmkunstpreis for The Vow beim Festival des deutschen Films
 2010 – Grimme-Preis for Kommissar Süden und der Luftgitarrist
 2010 – Schwabinger Kunstpreis
 2010 – Star on the Boulevard of Stars in Berlin
 2011 – Grimme-Preis for Im Angesicht des Verbrechens
 2011 – Bayerischer Fernsehpreis for Im Angesicht des Verbrechens
 2011 – Deutscher Regiepreis Metropolis in the category best television director for Im Angesicht des Verbrechens
 2012 – Grimme-Preis Spezial for Dreileben
 2012 – Hamburger Krimipreis for Polizeiruf 110: Cassandras Warnung

Writings 
 Dominik Graf: Verstörung im Kino. Der Regisseur von Die Sieger im Gespräch mit Stefan Stosch über die Arbeit am Film. Wehrhahn Verlag, Laatzen 1998, 47 S., 
 Dominik Graf: Schläft ein Lied in allen Dingen. Texte zum Film. Hrsg. und mit einem Vorwort von Michael Althen. Alexander Verlag, Berlin 2009, 
 Dominik Graf: Im Angesicht des Verbrechens. Fernseharbeit am Beispiel einer Fernsehserie. Hrsg. Johannes F. Sievert. Alexander Verlag, Berlin 2010, 
 Dominik Graf, Lisa Gotto: Kino unter Druck. Filmkultur hinter dem Eisernen Vorhang. Alexander Verlag, Berlin 2021,

Further reading
 Christoph Huber, Olaf Möller: Dominik Graf, FilmmuseumSynemaPublikationen Vol. 18, Vienna: SYNEMA – Gesellschaft für Film und Medien, 2013,

References

External links
 
 Fighter im System – Dominik Graf im Gespräch. Video interview at Cargo, November 2008 (German)
 Yearning for Genre: The Films of Dominik Graf. Essay by Marco Abel (English)
I Build a Jigsaw Puzzle of a Dream-Germany: An Interview with German Filmmaker Dominik Graf, Senses of Cinema Nr. 55 (English)
In der Mitte des Orkans. Interview with Dominik Graf (German)
Und plötzlich die Wirklichkeit... (German)
Retrospective Dominik Graf at the Austrian Film Museum, 2013

1952 births
Living people
Film directors from Munich
German television directors
Members of the Academy of Arts, Berlin
Best Director German Film Award winners